Kreditbanken is a former bank that was based in Stockholm, Sweden. Founded in 1923, it was merged with the Post Bank to form PK-Banken in 1974. PK-Banken purchased Nordbanken in 1980, and it later changed its name to Nordbanken, which in turn became part of Nordea.

The Kreditbanken is notable in that the condition known as Stockholm syndrome was named after the Norrmalmstorg robbery, which took place here.

Nobis Hotel Stockholm occupies the northern end of the building.

1974 disestablishments in Sweden
Defunct banks of Sweden
Banks established in 1923
Banks disestablished in 1974
Swedish companies established in 1923